Vera Kummerfeldt (born 11 April 1935) is a German middle-distance runner. She competed in the women's 800 metres at the 1960 Summer Olympics.

References

1935 births
Living people
Athletes (track and field) at the 1960 Summer Olympics
German female middle-distance runners
Olympic athletes of the United Team of Germany
Sportspeople from Wrocław
20th-century German women